Dr. J. Richard Steadman (June 4, 1937 – January 20, 2023) was an American orthopedic surgeon and founder of The Steadman Clinic and Steadman Philippon Research Institute (SPRI) located in Vail, Colorado. Steadman revolutionized orthopedic surgery, saved and advanced careers of many Olympic and professional sports champions, and helped recreational athletes stay physically active longer.

For a time, he was a clinical professor at the University of Texas Southwestern Medical Center in Dallas, but was perhaps best known medically for his work in the area of microfracture surgery, and publicly for treating injured sports stars from around the world. In January 2014, he announced his retirement from his surgical practice.

Biography 
Born in Sherman, Texas, Steadman received his undergraduate degree from Texas A&M University.

Following internship, two years in the US Army, and residency at Charity Hospital in New Orleans, Steadman moved to Lake Tahoe, California, where he practiced orthopedics, with increasing emphasis on the treatment of knee disorders.

His first elite sports client was alpine ski racer Cindy Nelson, and in 1976 he was named chief physician for the United States Ski Team. In 1989, his work was recognized with his election to the U.S. National Ski Hall of Fame. 

Dr. Steadman created his non-profit Steadman Sports Medicine Research Foundation in 1988 in Lake Tahoe. That organization exists today as Steadman Philippon Research Institute (SPRI), which is known worldwide for its clinical research database and study of orthopaedic injuries. In 1990, Dr. Steadman moved to Vail, Colo., to open The Steadman Clinic and broaden the scope of his orthopaedic research work.

Accomplishments 
Steadman developed numerous techniques for knee surgery and rehabilitation that made him a world-renowned expert on sports injuries. He was a leading expert in the repair and rehabilitation of knee injuries. He popularized microfracture knee surgery, a technique used to repair cartilage by poking tiny holes near the defective area. 

It is estimated that Dr. Steadman’s microfracture surgical procedure has been used to treat more than 500,000 patients per year worldwide.The technique has been adapted to treat other joints such as the shoulder, hip and ankle. The use of the microfracture procedure has allowed countless athletes of all levels to stay competitive in their sports, and its benefits can delay or even eliminate the need for more invasive procedures such as joint replacement surgery.

The complexity of the knee and its critical importance to athletic performance persuaded Dr. Steadman to focus nearly exclusively on disorders and injuries to that joint. Between 1989 and 1991, he worked to develop a treatment for a specific type of injury to the anterior cruciate ligament. It came to be known as the "healing response," which was designed to leverage the body's own healing potential. 

Dr. Steadman was also a pioneer in physical therapy and post-operative rehabilitation. Though unconventional at the time, he believed it was better to move an injured joint post-surgery rather than stabilizing it with a traditional plaster cast. His bold idea changed the way orthopedic surgeons and physical therapy professionals treat injuries around the world. 

Dr. Steadman treated countless Olympians and professional athletes across various sports and was sought out by some of the world's best-known athletes and public figures for treatment. His ability to return high-level athletes with injuries to medal-winning victories following surgery and rehab made him an iconic figure in sports medicine. Dr. Steadman's success in helping elite athletes who had suffered potentially career-ending injuries return to major athletic achievements included professional soccer players, NFL athletes, MLB players, NBA athletes and skiers.

The notoriety did not drive Dr. Steadman. He wanted to help every patient, at every level of sport, as he made clear in this statement:

On January 29, 2014, he announced that he was retiring from active surgical practice, however, he planned to continue consulting with his physician colleagues at The Steadman Clinic and serving as co-chairman of the Steadman Philippon Research Institute. He said, "I cannot imagine a more fulfilling career than the one I have had as an orthopaedic physician. I'm lucky to have had so many patients determined to win again in their sports after serious knee injuries.  Their will to succeed has played a large part in my success in treating them.  Now I look forward to taking part in further research projects with SPRI scientists."

Among the elite Olympian and professional athletes who went to Steadman’s clinic for procedures were: Ronaldo, Martina Navratilova, Lindsay Davenport, Dan Marino, Joe Montana, John Elway, Bruce Smith, Bode Miller and Picabo Street.

Awards
Albert Trillat Award for Excellence in Knee Research from the International Society for the Knee 
H. Edward Cabaud Memorial Award for Knee Research from the American Orthopedic Society for Sports Medicine 
GOTS-Beiersdorf Prize, Germany 
American Orthopaedic Society for Sports Medicine (AOSSM) Hall of Fame 
2001 Induction into the Colorado Ski Hall of Fame

References

External links 
The Steadman clinic
Bio at Forbes magazine
Citation at the Colorado Ski Hall of Fame
Interview on his microfracture technique
Video interview with Charlie Rose

1937 births
2023 deaths
People from Sherman, Texas
People from Dallas
People from Vail, Colorado
American sports physicians
Texas A&M University alumni
University of Texas Southwestern Medical Center alumni
University of Texas Southwestern Medical Center faculty